The RAKAA Professional League is the First Division in Saudi Arabia.

In the end of the Season 2012–13 the league was called Saudi First Division, but the league name has been renamed to RAKAA Professional League  and the name stands for a Holding provider called RAKAA which is now become an official sponsor of the First Division.

Teams

League table

References

External links 
 Saudi Arabia Football Federation
 Saudi League Statistics
 goalzz

Saudi First Division League seasons
Saudi
2